Alfred or Alf Hall may refer to:

 Alfred Hall (footballer), footballer for Burslem Port Vale in 1906
 Alfred Daniel Hall (1864–1942), British agriculturalist
 Alfred A. Hall (1848–1912), Vermont attorney, politician and judge
 Alfred Rupert Hall (1920–2009), British historian of science
 Alf Hall (1896–1964), South African cricketer
 Tubby Hall (Alfred Hall, 1895–1945), jazz drummer